Christian Volpi (born 25 May 1965) is a French former water polo player. He competed in the men's tournament at the 1988 Summer Olympics.

See also
 France men's Olympic water polo team records and statistics
 List of men's Olympic water polo tournament goalkeepers

References

External links
 

1965 births
Living people
French male water polo players
Water polo goalkeepers
Olympic water polo players of France
Water polo players at the 1988 Summer Olympics
People from Bourgoin-Jallieu
Sportspeople from Isère